Solomon "Sol" Wachtler (born April 29, 1930) is an American lawyer and Republican politician from New York. He was Chief Judge of the New York Court of Appeals from 1985 to 1992. Wachtler's most famous quote, made shortly after his appointment as Chief Judge, was that district attorneys could get grand juries to "indict a ham sandwich".

He achieved national notoriety when he was charged with, and then convicted of, acts stemming from threats he made against a former lover, Joy Silverman, and her daughter. Upon conviction, Wachtler served thirteen months in prison and a half-way house. After his release, Wachtler became an author and critic, as well as an advocate for the mentally ill.

Early life and education
Wachtler was born in Brooklyn, New York but was mostly raised in the South due to the fact that his father, Phillip, was a traveling salesman. His mother, Faye, was an immigrant from Russia. Wachtler is Jewish. Wachtler graduated with both a B.A. and an LL.B. from Washington and Lee University. He served in the United States Army before moving to Great Neck, Long Island, near his wife's family, where he worked as an attorney.

Career
He began his political career in 1963, when he was first elected to be a councilman, then Town Supervisor of the Town of North Hempstead, New York. In 1968 after a failed bid for Nassau County executive Republican Governor Nelson Rockefeller appointed him to the New York State Supreme Court. In 1972, he was elected to the New York Court of Appeals where he served for nearly 20 years and authored close to 400 opinions. In January 1985, Democratic Governor Mario Cuomo appointed him Chief Judge of the Court of Appeals.

The same month as his appointment, Wachtler was quoted by the New York Daily News as saying that "district attorneys now have so much influence on grand juries that 'by and large' they could get them to 'indict a ham sandwich.'" This quote was then used by Tom Wolfe (and attributed to Wachtler) in Wolfe's 1987 novel The Bonfire of the Vanities, paraphrased into "a grand jury would 'indict a ham sandwich', if that's what you wanted." As of 2018, the "ham sandwich" phrase remains in common usage in legal discussions.

Wachtler's 1975 decision in Chapadeau v. Utica Observer protected the right of the defendant newspaper (and by extension of the press in general) to cover issues of public concern without undue exposure to suits for libel.  The reasoning of the Chapadeau decision was influential with courts throughout the United States.  Also known for the remark, "A marriage license should not be viewed as a license for a husband to forcibly rape his wife with impunity" (in People v. Liberta), Wachtler was a key figure in making spousal rape a criminal offense.

Wachtler wrote the majority opinion in a 1988 right to die case interpreting the statute's requirement of "clear and convincing evidence" that a person who can no longer communicate would have wanted to die in a particular circumstance. The majority opinion set a stricter standard of "clear and convincing" than the lower courts, and refused to let a patient's family withdraw life support. General statements by a person that he or she would not want to live in such a condition are not acceptable under the decision. The decision was criticized by right-to-die organizations as being too strict and unworkable, and taking decision-making away from family members. Wachtler was criticized for writing the decision while his own 86-year-old mother was recovering from a stroke. His formulation of this higher standard of proof was later adopted by the United States Supreme Court.

As Chief Judge, Wachtler served not only as the head of the Court of Appeals, but also as the chief administrator for the state court system. He made significant administrative changes, called for the merit selection of judges, implemented streamlined procedures, reduced opportunities for "judge shopping," and reformed the state's grand jury system. Wachtler also tried to improve women's and minorities' access to justice. He created a New York State Judicial Commission for Minority Concerns, a Workforce Diversity Program, and a New York State Task Force on Gender Bias.

Criminal charges and resignation
In 1988, Wachtler began an affair with Joy Silverman. At the time, Wachtler was a co-executor of the estate of Alvin Wolosoff, Silverman's stepfather and the uncle of Wachtler's wife. He was also trustee of four trusts stemming from Wolosoff's estate for the benefit of Silverman and her family. The trusts (in aggregate) were reported to be worth US$24 million at the time. According to then-United States Attorney Michael Chertoff, over time, Wachtler received fees of more than US$800,000 for his work as executor and trustee of the entire estate. After Silverman ended the affair in September 1991, Wachtler began to harass her.

Wachtler was arrested on 7 November 1992, on charges including extortion, racketeering, and blackmail. Prosecutors alleged that he demanded a $20,000 blackmail payment in exchange for turning over compromising photographs and tapes of Silverman with her then boyfriend, attorney David Samson. He eventually pleaded guilty to harassing Silverman and threatening to kidnap her daughter. He resigned as a judge and from the bar, and Governor Mario Cuomo appointed Judith S. Kaye to replace him as chief judge of the Court of Appeals. He served his sentence, first at the medium-security Federal Correctional Institution in Butner, North Carolina, and from December 1993 at the Federal Medical Center in Rochester, Minnesota after he was stabbed in the shoulder while dozing in his cell in November.

Wachtler was sentenced to 15 months, but received time off for good behavior.  His sentence started 28 September 1993. He was released after serving 13 months.

Later life
After his release from prison, Wachtler wrote a prison memoir, After the Madness and a book of fiction, Blood Brothers. He also contributed to the book Serving Mentally Ill Defendants and has written as a critic-at-large for The New Yorker Magazine. He is currently an adjunct professor at Touro Law School and Chair of the Law and Psychiatry Institute of North Shore Long Island Jewish Hospital. He is an advocate for the mentally ill and has received awards from the Mental Health Association of the State of New York and New York City. Wachtler's New York law license was restored by the New York Supreme Court, Appellate Division on October 2, 2007.

Personal life
Wachtler married his high school sweetheart, Joan Carol Wolosoff, the daughter of homebuilder Leon Wolosoff, granddaughter of lumberman Max Blumberg, and niece of New York State Senator, George Blumberg. They had four children: attorney Lauren Wachtler Montclare; Marjorie Wachtler Eagan, a docent at the Metropolitan Museum of Art; actress and model Alison Wachtler Braunstein; and real estate developer Philip Wachtler. His daughter, Lauren, married attorney Paul Douglas Montclare in 1983. His son, Philip Wachtler, is married to Robin Wilpon, daughter of New York Mets former owner Fred Wilpon. Wachtler lives in Manhasset, New York.

In Popular Culture
The Season 4 episode "Censure" of Law & Order is based on Wachtler's affair and conviction.

References

Sources
 The Political Graveyard, Wachtler, Sol

Further reading

External links
  
 

1930 births
Living people
20th-century American memoirists
20th-century American novelists
Chief Judges of the New York Court of Appeals
New York Supreme Court Justices
Place of birth missing (living people)
Washington and Lee University School of Law alumni
People with bipolar disorder
People from Manhasset, New York
New York (state) Republicans
American male novelists
Jewish American novelists
Jewish American people in New York (state) politics
New York (state) politicians convicted of crimes
Touro College faculty
Novelists from New York (state)
American male non-fiction writers
American people of Russian-Jewish descent
Judges convicted of crimes
20th-century American Jews
20th-century American male writers